Chichi Ojei is a Nigerian politician.

Background 
Chichi Ojei is a Nigerian who was born in Delta, South-South Nigeria, in 1978. She got her education in Nigeria and overseas. She attended the American International School, Lagos, Nigeria, Institut Le Rosay in Rolle, Switzerland, she later obtained a Bachelor's Degree in Business Administration from the North Eastern University, USA and also got a MBA from the Regent's Business School, London.

Before joining politics, Ojei was a finance specialist and the Executive Director of Nuel Ojei Holdings. Ahead of the 2023 elections, she joined the Allied People's Movement, APM, a political party registered by the Independent National Electoral Commission, INEC as one of the recognized political parties in Nigeria. She was endorsed as the Presidential candidate of the Party on August 14, 2022.

During her campaigns, she expressed optimism about winning the election in the male dominated race.

Her hope of becoming the President in 2023 could however, not be realized as her Party dropped her and adopted the Presidential candidate of the People's Democratic Party, PDP, Atiku Abubakar, as its candidate.

References 

Living people
21st-century Nigerian politicians